Mikhail Leontyevich Mil (22 November 1909 – 31 January 1970) was a Russian aerospace engineer and scientist. He was the founder and general designer of the Mil Moscow Helicopter Plant.

Biography
Born to a Russian family in Irkutsk. His father was an employee of the Trans-Siberian Railway, and his mother was a dentist. His grandfather was a cantonist who had been drafted from Libava (today Liepāja), Latvia, and who settled in Siberia after 25 years in the Imperial Russian Navy.

At age 12 Mil won the first prize in a model glider competition. In 1926 he entered the Siberian Technological Institute in Tomsk; however, since there was no curriculum for aeronautical engineering, he decided to transfer in 1928 to the Don Polytechnical Institute in Novocherkassk, where he was able to specialise in aviation. He married a fellow student, P.G. Rudenko, in 1932 and 4 daughters and a son followed.

After graduating from the institute in 1931, Mil began his career at TsAGI, too late to work under its original founder, Nikolay Yegorovich Zhukovsky. He specialised in the design of autogyros, and was an assistant to his future rival, Nikolay Kamov. With the start of World War II, Mil was drafted into the Red Army and fought on the Eastern Front in 1941 near Yelnya. In 1943 he was called back to continue research and development in improving the stability and control of combat aircraft. He completed his dissertations ("Candidate", 1943, PhD, 1945) and in 1947 headed the Helicopter Lab at TsAGI, which was later turned into the Moscow Helicopter Plant.

Mil's creations won many domestic and international awards and set 69 world records. Most notably, the Mil Mi-4 won a gold medal in the Brussels International Exhibition in 1958. In 1971, after his death, his Mil Mi-12 (production name of V-12 prototype) won the Sikorsky Prize as the most powerful helicopter in the world. Unlike his Soviet counterpart, Nikolai Kamov, Mil enjoyed great prestige due to his single-rotor helicopters, as Kamov used the co-axial rotor layout, which was more controversial.

He died in 1970 in Moscow and was buried in Yudinskoe Cemetery in the outskirts of Moscow.

Awards and honors
Order of Lenin (three times) (incl. 28 July 1966)
Order of the Red Banner of Labour
Order of the Red Star
Hero of Socialist Labour - for outstanding contributions to the development of Soviet aviation, Mikhail Leontyevich Mil was awarded the title Hero of Socialist Labour and the Order of Lenin and the Hammer and Sickle Gold Medal
Lenin Prize (1958)
USSR State Prize (1968)
Order of the Patriotic War, 2nd class
Order of Polonia Restituta, 5th class (Poland)

References
Pederson, Jay. International Directory of Company Histories, Vol. 24, St James Press (1998) 
Bull, Stephan. Encyclopedia of Military Technology and Innovation, Greenwood (2004) 
Gordon, Yefim. Soviet Air Power in World War II. Midland Publishing (2008) 

1909 births
1970 deaths
People from Irkutsk
People from Irkutsk Governorate
Soviet aerospace engineers
Heroes of Socialist Labour
Recipients of the Order of Lenin
Lenin Prize winners
Recipients of the USSR State Prize
Knights of the Order of Polonia Restituta
Tomsk Polytechnic University alumni
Russian people of Latvian descent